James Ishmael Ford (Zeno Myoun, Roshi) is an American Zen Buddhist priest and a retired Unitarian Universalist minister. He was born in Oakland, California on July 17, 1948. He earned a BA in psychology from Sonoma State University, as well as an M.Div. and an MA in the Philosophy of Religion, both from the Pacific School of Religion.

Biography

Ford began his Zen studies in 1968 at the Berkeley Zen Center under the direction of Mel Weitsman, later Weitsman, Roshi. He was ordained unsui and received Dharma transmission from the late Jiyu Kennett Roshi. After leaving Kennett Roshi's Shasta Abbey and for a brief time exploring other religious traditions including the Episcopal Church, the western Gnostic tradition and Inayat Khan Sufism, Ford pursued Zen koan introspection for nearly twenty years in the Sanbo Kyodan tradition with John Tarrant Roshi, with whom he completed formal training and from whom he received Inka Shomei (formal recognition as an authorized Zen teacher) in 2005.

Ford began to be seriously involved in Unitarian Universalism at about the same time he began his work with Tarrant Roshi. After completing theological studies he became a Unitarian Universalist minister, serving Unitarian Universalist congregations in Wisconsin and Arizona before becoming senior minister of the First Unitarian Society in Newton, MA in 2000.   In May 2008 First Unitarian Church of Providence, RI called him to its pulpit; he began his ministry there in the summer of that year. 

Roshi Ford also maintained his relationships within the Soto community, and in 2004 Ford participated in the first Dharma Heritage ceremony of the forming North American Soto Zen Buddhist Association. This event, designed to be the equivalent of the Japanese Soto Zuisse ceremony, was a public acknowledgment of Ford (among others) as a senior member of the North American Zen community.  Ford, a past president of the Unitarian Universalist Buddhist Fellowship, was the first Unitarian Universalist minister to be named a Zen master.

Roshi Ford is a significant figure in the establishment of Zen in North America. He is the co-founder and first abbot of Boundless Way Zen, a network of meditation groups mostly in eastern Massachusetts. He was also influential in the development of the Buddhist Temple of Toledo in Ohio. 

In 2015, Ford retired from his ministry at the First Unitarian Church of Providence, left Boundless Way, and moved to Long Beach, California. He then established the Empty Moon Zen Network, a network of Zen Centers in California, Washington state, and Pennsylvania.

In 2020 he started serving as consulting minister to the historic First Unitarian Church of Los Angeles.

Ford is a member of the American Zen Teachers Association and served on its membership committee for a decade. he is also a member of the Soto Zen Buddhist Association, in which he served on the board of directors. He maintains connections with the Unitarian Universalist community through his work with their Society for Community Ministries and Spiritual Director’s Network.

Roshi Ford has nine Dharma heirs including Josh Jiun Bartok Roshi; Melissa Myozen Blacker Roshi of Boundless Way Temple; Dosho Port (suspended indefinitely from Soto Zen Buddhist Association in 2022 for ethical violations); and Jay Rinsen Weik Roshi of the Buddhist Temple of Toledo, Ohio.

Bibliography

See also
Soto Zen Buddhist Association
Timeline of Zen Buddhism in the United States

References

External links
Monkey Mind Online - James Ishmael Ford's blog

1948 births
Living people
Zen Buddhism writers
American Unitarian Universalists
Zen Buddhist priests
American Zen Buddhists
Unitarian Universalist clergy
Pacific School of Religion alumni